Palaina waterhousei, also known as the wide-ribbed staircase snail, is a species of staircase snail that is endemic to Australia's Lord Howe Island in the Tasman Sea.

Description
The pupiform shell of adult snails is 2.8–3.1 mm in height, with a diameter of 1.7 mm, with a domed spire. It is white in colour, with golden-brown apical whorls. It has widely spaced, axal ribs. The umbilicus is closed. The circular aperture has a strongly reflected lip and an operculum is present.

Habitat
The snail is common and widespread across the island.

References

 
waterhousei
Gastropods of Lord Howe Island
Taxa named by Tom Iredale
Gastropods described in 1944